Porter Andrew Moser (born August 24, 1968) is a college basketball coach who is the current head coach of the University of Oklahoma men's basketball team. Moser spent 10 years (2011–2021) at Loyola University Chicago, helping lead the Ramblers to the Final Four in 2018.

Originally from Naperville, Illinois, Moser attended and played varsity basketball at Benet Academy, and then Creighton University. Moser previously held the head coaching position at Illinois State (2003–2007) and Arkansas-Little Rock (2000–2003). Prior to being hired at Loyola, Moser was an assistant coach at Saint Louis under Rick Majerus for the 2007-08 season, and the associate head coach from 2008-11.

Playing career

During his high school career, Moser helped lead Benet Academy in suburban Lisle to a 70-14 (.833) record in three years on the varsity roster, playing for coach Bill Geist. The Naperville native led Benet to three West Suburban Catholic Conference titles and was a three-time all-conference and two-time all-area selection. As a senior, he was named Most Valuable Player in the West Suburban Catholic Conference. On May 6, 2017, he was inducted into the Illinois Basketball Coaches Association (IBCA) Hall of Fame. 

Moser went on to play college basketball at Creighton University for coach Tony Barone, where he helped the Bluejays to a Missouri Valley Conference Championship and NCAA Tournament appearance in 1989. He played in 102 games including 27 starts, averaging 4.6 points and 1.7 assists per game during his collegiate career.

Coaching career

Assistant
After graduating from Creighton, Moser began his coaching career in the 1990–91 season as a graduate assistant at Creighton under Barone. Following Barone to Texas A&M, Moser was an assistant there from 1991 to 1995 and helped Texas A&M make its first postseason appearance in seven years, in the 1994 National Invitation Tournament. After serving as an assistant at Milwaukee in the 1995–96 season, Moser returned to Texas A&M for what would become Barone's final two seasons as head coach from 1996 to 1998.

From 1998 to 2000, Moser was an assistant coach at Arkansas–Little Rock, under Wimp Sanderson in his first season and Sidney Moncrief in his second.

Arkansas–Little Rock
Moser's first head coaching job was with Arkansas–Little Rock from 2000 to 2003. Inheriting a 4-24 team, Moser led the Trojans to an 18-11 record in his first season and finished with an overall 54-34 record. Statistically, the Trojans moved from last to first in the Sun Belt Conference in field goal percentage defense and three-point field goal percentage defense in Moser's first season in 2000–01.

Illinois State
Moser was the head coach at Illinois State from 2003 to 2007. After finishing the 2003-04 season 10-19, Moser led Illinois State to a 17-13 overall record and sixth-place finish in the Missouri Valley Conference (MVC). However, Illinois State dropped to 9-19 in 2005-06 season, including a 1–9 finish. 

Despite an improvement to 15–16 in 2006-07 season, Illinois State lost in the first round of the MVC Tournament for the 3rd consecutive season. Seeking a change "in the overall direction of the program," Illinois State Athletics Director Sheahon Zenger fired Moser and terminated the contracts of Moser's three assistant coaches on March 5, 2007.

Saint Louis
Ranked in the top 50 Division I assistant coaches by Basketball Times in 2009, Moser was an assistant coach at Saint Louis under Rick Majerus from 2007 to 2011, including as associate head coach from 2008 to 2011. In 2009–10, Saint Louis finished 23-13 and as CBI runners-up.

Loyola–Chicago
On April 5, 2011, Loyola University Chicago named Moser head coach of the Loyola Ramblers men's basketball team. Moser's hire followed the firing of Jim Whitesell, who went 109–107 in seven seasons. In his introductory press conference, Moser said that he aspired to make Loyola–Chicago into a Horizon League contender similar to Butler.

Under Moser, Loyola–Chicago went 7–23 in the 2011–12 season and 15–16 in 2012–13 before moving from the Horizon League to the Missouri Valley Conference (MVC) in 2013. In its first season in the MVC, Loyola–Chicago went 10–22. Moser's fourth season was his first at Loyola–Chicago with a winning record, at 24–13 (8–10 MVC) and the College Basketball Invitational title following a two-game sweep of Louisiana–Monroe. After a 15–17 season in 2015–16, Loyola–Chicago had its second winning season under Moser in 2016–17 with an 18–14 (8–10 MVC) record.

2018 Final Four run

Moser had his most successful season at Loyola–Chicago in 2017–18, with a 32–6 (15–3 MVC) record, MVC regular season and tournament titles, and appearance in the Final Four as a no. 11 seed.

The MVC preseason poll picked Loyola–Chicago to finish third, with one vote picking Loyola–Chicago for first place. On December 6, 2017, Loyola–Chicago beat a top-five team for the first time since the 1984–85 season after a 65-59 away upset of no. 5 Florida. On March 4, 2018, Loyola–Chicago defeated Moser's former school Illinois State 65-49 in the MVC tournament final to qualify for the NCAA tournament for the first time since 1985.

Entering the NCAA Tournament as a no. 11 seed, Loyola–Chicago had close upset victories in the first three rounds, 64-62 over no. 6 Miami (FL) in the Round of 64, 63-62 over no. 3 Tennessee in the Round of 32, and 69-68 over no. 7 Nevada in the Sweet 16. The win over Nevada was the 30th overall win for Loyola–Chicago, enough for the most wins in program history.

Loyola–Chicago advanced to its first Final Four since the 1963 national title year, after a 78-62 win over no. 9 Kansas State. Loyola became only the fourth no. 11 seed to reach the Final Four, after LSU in 1986, George Mason in 2006, and VCU in 2011. On March 31, Loyola–Chicago lost to no. 3 Michigan 69-57 in their Final Four game held at the Alamodome in San Antonio.

Prior to Final Four weekend, Moser expressed hope that his team's run in the tournament would make it easier for other mid-major programs to earn at-large NCAA Tournament bids.

Recruiting Chicago-area players
Moser had success drawing recruits from the Chicago area talent pool. Former players Milton Doyle (Marshall), Donte Ingram (Simeon), Christian Negron (Elgin), and Cameron Krutwig (Jacobs) as well as current (2021-22) players Lucas Williamson (Whitney Young), Marquise Kennedy (Brother Rice) and Tom Welch (Naperville North) are all from the Chicago area.

Oklahoma
On April 2, 2021, Moser accepted the head coaching position at the University of Oklahoma, succeeding retired coach Lon Kruger. Moser agreed to a 6-year contract with the Sooners. He was officially announced as the Sooners' head coach in a press conference on April 7.

Broadcasting
During the 2019 NCAA tournament, Moser signed on with CBS and Turner as a guest TV studio analyst for the second round of the tournament.

Personal life
Moser and his wife Megan have four children: Jordan, Jake, Ben, and Max.

Head coaching record

See also
 List of NCAA Division I Men's Final Four appearances by coach

References

External links
Oklahoma bio

1968 births
Living people
Basketball coaches from Illinois
Basketball players from Illinois
Benet Academy alumni
College men's basketball head coaches in the United States
Creighton Bluejays men's basketball coaches
Creighton Bluejays men's basketball players
Illinois State Redbirds men's basketball coaches
Little Rock Trojans men's basketball coaches
Loyola Ramblers men's basketball coaches
Milwaukee Panthers men's basketball coaches
People from Wilmette, Illinois
Saint Louis Billikens men's basketball coaches
Sportspeople from Cook County, Illinois
Texas A&M Aggies men's basketball coaches